Jeffrey Thomas Bridich (born September 10, 1977) is a former American baseball executive. He was the general manager of the Colorado Rockies of Major League Baseball from 2014 to 2021.

Biography
Bridich is from Whitefish Bay in Milwaukee County, Wisconsin. He attended Marquette University High School, where he played for the school's baseball and American football teams. He enrolled at Harvard University, where he played college baseball for the Harvard Crimson. He began his tenure with the Crimson as a catcher before playing as an outfielder. He graduated from Harvard in 2000. After his graduation, Bridich worked as an intern in Major League Baseball's (MLB) executive office. He worked for MLB for four years, and helped lead the Arizona Fall League.

Bridich joined the Rockies' front office in December 2004, when he was hired to manage the team's Minor League Baseball operations. In October 2005, the Rockies promoted Bridich to succeed Thad Levine as their director of baseball operations. He served as the Rockies' senior director of player development from 2011 through 2014. After the 2014 season, on October 8, Dan O'Dowd, the Rockies' general manager, and Bill Geivett, the Rockies' director of major league operations, resigned. Bridich was appointed the team's new general manager to succeed them. The Rockies announced on April 26, 2021 that Bridich had stepped down as general manager.

Personal life
Bridich's father, Rick, also played college baseball for the Harvard Crimson. Rick coached Jeff's high school baseball team. Jeff Bridich currently resides in Denver, Colorado, where he lives with his wife, Sarah. They have two children.

References

External links

1977 births
Living people
Colorado Rockies executives
Harvard Crimson baseball players
Sportspeople from Milwaukee
Major League Baseball general managers
Marquette University High School alumni